Kowsar County is in Ardabil province, Iran. The capital of the county is the city of Kivi. At the 2006 census, the county's population was 27,472 in 6,085 households. The following census in 2011 counted 26,198 people in 6,960 households. At the 2016 census, the county's population was 22,127 in 6,586 households.

Administrative divisions

The population history of Kowsar County's administrative divisions over three consecutive censuses is shown in the following table. The latest census shows two districts, four rural districts, and one city.

References

 

Counties of Ardabil Province